|}

The Firth of Clyde Stakes is a Group 3 flat horse race in Great Britain open to two-year-old fillies. It is run at Ayr over a distance of 6 furlongs (1,207 metres), and it is scheduled to take place each year in September.

The event is named after the Firth of Clyde, an area of water off the coast of Ayr. For a period it held Listed status, and it was promoted to Group 3 level in 2004. It is now the only Group race in Scotland.

The Firth of Clyde Stakes is held during the three-day Ayr Gold Cup Festival (previously known as the Western Meeting). It is currently run on the final day, the same day as the Ayr Gold Cup.

Records

Leading jockey since 1984 (3 wins):
 Paul Mulrennan – Melody of Love (2012), Delectation (2016), Barefoot Angel (2022)

Leading trainer since 1984 (4 wins):
 Barry Hills – Ulla Laing (1984), Braari (1993), My Branch (1995), Queen Sceptre (1996)

Winners since 1984

Earlier winners

 1976: Mofida
 1977: Saltation
 1978: Abbeydale
 1979: Pink Blues
 1980: Star Pastures
 1981: Warm Hearted
 1982: Myra's Best
 1983: Rocket Alert

See also
 Horse racing in Great Britain
 List of British flat horse races

References

 Paris-Turf: 

 Racing Post:
 galopp-sieger.de – Firth of Clyde Stakes.
 horseracingintfed.com – International Federation of Horseracing Authorities – Firth of Clyde Stakes (2018).
 pedigreequery.com – Firth of Clyde Stakes – Ayr.

Flat races in Great Britain
Ayr Racecourse
Flat horse races for two-year-old fillies